621 Werdandi is a Themistian asteroid.

References

External links 

 
 

Themis asteroids
Werdandi
Werdandi
FCX:-type asteroids (Tholen)
19061111